Holiday Heights is an unincorporated community and census-designated place (CDP) located within Berkeley Township, in Ocean County, New Jersey, United States. As of the 2010 United States Census, the CDP's population was 2,099.

Geography
According to the United States Census Bureau, the CDP had a total area of 4.944 square miles (12.804 km2), all of which was land.

Demographics

Census 2010

Census 2000
As of the 2000 United States Census there were 2,389 people, 1,369 households, and 941 families living in the CDP. The population density was 184.5/km2 (477.9/mi2). There were 1,393 housing units at an average density of 107.6/km2 (278.7/mi2). The racial makeup of the CDP was 99.16% White, 0.46% African American, 0.25% Asian, and 0.13% from two or more races. Hispanic or Latino of any race were 1.30% of the population.

There were 1,369 households, out of which 0.2% had children under the age of 18 living with them, 64.7% were married couples living together, 3.4% had a female householder with no husband present, and 31.2% were non-families. 29.8% of all households were made up of individuals, and 27.9% had someone living alone who was 65 years of age or older. The average household size was 1.75 and the average family size was 2.06.

In the CDP the population was spread out, with 0.3% under the age of 18, 0.1% from 18 to 24, 2.0% from 25 to 44, 10.8% from 45 to 64, and 86.8% who were 65 years of age or older. The median age was 73 years. For every 100 females, there were 78.6 males. For every 100 females age 18 and over, there were 78.3 males.

The median income for a household in the CDP was $30,025, and the median income for a family was $33,360. Males had a median income of $45,573 versus $25,313 for females. The per capita income for the CDP was $19,062. About 2.3% of families and 2.0% of the population were below the poverty line, including none of those under age 18 and 2.3% of those age 65 or over.

References

Berkeley Township, New Jersey
Census-designated places in Ocean County, New Jersey